Gavrilo IV was Archbishop of Peć and Serbian Patriarch for a short time during the turbulent year of 1758. He was an ethnic Greek.

Before Gavrilo became Serbian Patriarch, he was the metropolitan of an unknown eparchy, under Serbian patriarchs Vikentije I and Pajsije II. In 1758, during the great internal turmoil in the Serbian Patriarchate of Peć, when patriarch Vikentije I died in Constantinople and his successor Pajsije II seized the patriarchal throne, metropolitan Gavrilo took the opportunity and succeeded in overthrowing patriarch Pajsije II and becoming the new Serbian Patriarch as "Gavrilo IV". His tenure was also very short since his main rival was another ethnic Greek, metropolitan Kirilo, who succeeded in overthrowing Gavrilo IV and becoming the new Serbian Patriarch as Kirilo II.

References

Sources

External links
 Official site of the Serbian Orthodox Church: Serbian Archbishops and Patriarchs 

Gavrilo IV
18th-century Greek people
Greeks from the Ottoman Empire